White Hall is a city in Greene County, Illinois, United States. The population was 2,520 at the 2010 census.

History

A post office called White Hall has been in operation since 1827. In 1830 a David Barrow was the first person to built and in location that would become White Hall. Two years later he bought another 80 acres of land at the price of $200 for the purpose of creating the town.  Four years later, in 1836 White Hall was official established. This area was the home to a long, white tavern owned by James Allen, which was the only hotel between Carrollton, Illinois and Jacksonville, Illinois. The town got its name from the fact that when a stage was approaching the tavern, the driver would call out "Next stop, the White Hall."

White Hall became known for pottery as ceramics was historically one of the town's top industries.  Between 1825 and 1948 White Hall had 39 commercial potteries.  One of the earliest was established by John Neff Ebey.   Other pottery operations included William Heath, George Ebey, David Brunk, the Davis brothers, David Culbertson, A. D. Ruckel, the Vermillion brothers, William Teter, and the White Hall Sewer Pipe & Stoneware Company.   Stoneware from A. D. Ruckel’s White Hall Pottery Works and White Hall Sewer Pipe and Stoneware Company remain well known to collectors.

Geography
White Hall is located at  (39.439466, -90.399248).

Climate

Demographics

As of the 2010 census, there were 2,520 people, 1,031 households, and 657 families residing in the city. The racial makeup of the city was 98.81% White, 0.04% African American, 0.32% Native American, 0.12% Asian, 0.24% from other races, and 0.48% from two or more races. Hispanic or Latino of any race were 0.52% of the population.

There were 1,031 households, out of which 29.87% had children under the age of 18 living with them, 44.52% were married couples living together, 13.19% had a female householder with no husband present, and 36.28% were non-families. 31.52% of all households were made up of individuals, and 15.42% had someone living alone who was 65 years of age or older.  The average household size was 2.37 and the average family size was 2.93.

In the city, the age distribution of the population shows 23.10% under the age of 18, 7.90% from 18 to 24, 22.78% from 25 to 44, 26.67% from 45 to 64, and 19.58% who were 65 years of age or older.  The median age was 41.8 years. For every 100 females, there were 91.93 males.  For every 100 females age 18 and over, there were 88.16 males age 18 and over.

The median income for a household in the city was $34,228, and the median income for a family was $38,281. The per capita income for the city was $17,804.  About 21.8% of families and 26.0% of the population were below the poverty line, including 36.2% of those under age 18 and 17.2% of those age 65 or over.

Notable people

 Edward B. Giller, United States Air Force general
 Chappie McFarland, pitcher for the St. Louis Cardinals, Pittsburgh Pirates and Brooklyn Superbas
 Monte McFarland, pitcher for the Chicago Colts

References

External links
 White Hall history page
 The White Hall Pottery Center

Cities in Greene County, Illinois
Cities in Illinois